Zhoucun district is a district in Zibo, Shandong Province, China. Its main industry is textiles and furniture manufacture. The center of the commercial district has a recently refurbished area with traditional buildings. Some of the filming for Zhang Yimou's film To Live was done in the district.

Historical anecdote 
In the 17th century, the textile industry was flourishing in Zhoucun, while the local government was corrupted to a point that it set up a department called "" for extorting money. The department hired parasitic scumbags to levy various high taxes. It was not long before the merchants disappointed and began to leave.

Meanwhile, the Ministry of Justice of the Qing Government, Huahsi Lee, came back to Zhoucun to see his family. He was outraged by the state of the economy of his hometown, and reported to Emperor Shunzhi. It would have been embarrassing for Shunzhi not to show his mercy, but inadequate to take ease on his taxes. He compromised: Zhoucun shall take only one day off the tax.

This kind of stingy "mercy" was really some gigantic excrement drained upon Huahsi's head, but he thought of a way around it. Hushsi made orders to build a monument with "" ("No Tax Today") carvings ambiguously under the command of the emperor, so merchants are able to do business tax-free all the time.

Later on Huahsi felt guilty about tax evasion and undertook the taxes himself. Huahsi even promised that whoever got robbed within 200 Li(about 115 km) around Zhoucun shall get reparation from his family. Such act maintained for seven generations, about 200 years.

The economically preposterous and doubtful monument is still at the center of the relics called "", but it was long invalid.'''

Administrative divisions
Zhoucun district is divided to 5 subdistricts and 4 towns.
Subdistricts

Towns

Climate

References

County-level divisions of Shandong
Zibo